Pseudoeurycea ahuitzotl, commonly known as the imperial salamander, is a species of salamander in the family Plethodontidae. It is endemic to Mexico and only known from its type locality, Cerro Teotepec (Sierra Madre del Sur) in Guerrero, at about  asl. It is known from open fir-pine-oak forest with bunchgrass. It seems to require fallen logs for hiding at the daytime.

References

ahuitzotl
Endemic amphibians of Mexico
Fauna of the Sierra Madre del Sur
Amphibians described in 1996
Taxonomy articles created by Polbot